The 2018–19 Radford Highlanders women's basketball team represented Radford University during the 2018–19 NCAA Division I women's basketball season. The Highlanders are led by sixth year head coach Mike McGuire. They finished the season 26–7, 17–1 in Big South play win the Big South regular season title. Radford won the conference tournament championship game over the Campbell Lady Camels, 57–45 to earn an automatic bid of the NCAA women's tournament where they lost to Maryland in the first round.

Roster

Schedule

|-
!colspan=9 style=| Exhibition

|-
!colspan=9 style=| Non-conference regular season

|-
!colspan=9 style=| Big South regular season

|-
!colspan=9 style=| Big South Women's Tournament

|-
!colspan=9 style=| NCAA Women's Tournament

See also
 2018–19 Radford Highlanders men's basketball team

References

Radford Highlanders women's basketball
Radford
Radford Highlanders women's basketball
Radford Highlanders women's basketball
Radford